Samara Sheppard (born 1990) is a mountain bike racing and road bicycle racing cyclist from New Zealand. She competed for New Zealand at the 2018 Commonwealth Games on the Gold Coast, finishing ninth out of twelve competitors in the women's cross-country competition.

Life 
Sheppard was born in Clyde in the South Island of New Zealand. She suffered a series of injuries as a runner which led her to move into cycling as an alternative sport. She relocated to Australia in 2016 and won a New Zealand title in 2017 and Oceania titles in 2017 and 2018. She also won an Australian title, the elite women's section of the Australian Mountain Bike National Series, in 2018.

Major results

Road
2020
 2nd Gravel and Tar
 9th Overall Women's Herald Sun Tour

References

Living people
1990 births
People from Clyde, New Zealand
Cyclists at the 2018 Commonwealth Games
New Zealand mountain bikers
Commonwealth Games competitors for New Zealand
21st-century New Zealand women